was a river gunboat of the Imperial Japanese Navy, part of the 11th Gunboat Sentai, that operated on the Yangtze River in China during the 1930s, and during the Second Sino-Japanese War and World War II.

Background
Futami was the second of two vessels in the  river gunboats built under the 1927 Fleet Building Program of the Imperial Japanese Navy for operations on the inland waterways of China.

Design
The Atami-class river gunboats were an improved version of the previous  design.

The ship was initially armed with one /28 caliber guns and five  machine guns.

Service record
 Futami was laid down on 25 June 1929 and launched on 20 November 1929 at the Fujinagata Shipyards in Osaka, Japan. Although most Japanese river gunboats were incapable of open ocean sailing, and had to be broken down into sections and shipped for reassembly in Shanghai,  Futami was successfully sailed to China in 1930.  She was assigned to patrols of the Yangtze River from Shanghai to the Three Gorges, for commerce protection and as a show of force in protection of Japanese nationals and economic interests from 1 June 1931. On 14 June 1933, she ran aground on uncharted rocks in the Yangtze River and could not be refloated and repaired until August.

From February to May 1939, Futami was part of the Japanese attempt to seize Battle of Nanchang under the command of the China Area Fleet's 1st China Expeditionary Fleet. She remained based out of Hankou throughout World War II and was removed from the navy list on 30 September 1945.

In 1946, she was ceded to the Republic of China as a prize of war, and commissioned into the Republic of China Navy as the Yung An. After the Chinese Civil War and commissioned into the People's Liberation Army Navy on 30 November 1949 as the gunboat Zhu Jiang. She was finally scrapped in the 1960s.

Notes

References

External links
 
 Japanese gunboats (with photos) 
 Monograph 144 Chapter II

Atami-class gunboats
Second Sino-Japanese War naval ships of Japan
1929 ships
Ships built by Fujinagata Shipyards
Ships of the Republic of China Navy
Ships of the People's Liberation Army Navy